"I'll Make You Music" is a song written by Bruce Roberts and performed by Beverly Bremers. It reached No. 18 on the Billboard easy listening chart and No. 63 on the Billboard Hot 100 in 1972.

The song was featured on her 1972 album, I'll Make You Music. The song was produced by Steve Metz, David Lipton, and Norman Bergen and arranged by Bergen.

Other versions
Peta Toppano released a version of the song as a single in Australia in 1973.

References

1972 songs
1972 singles
1973 singles
Beverly Bremers songs
Songs written by Bruce Roberts (singer)
Scepter Records singles